John Williams, also formerly credited as Johnny Williams, worked as a jazz pianist and studio musician before starting to compose for television and film.  Throughout his career he has directed his own works whenever possible.

In a career spanning more than 65 years, he has won five Academy Awards for Best Original Score (Jaws, Star Wars, E.T. the Extra-Terrestrial, Schindler's List) and one for Best Scoring: Adaptation and Original Song Score (Fiddler on the Roof).  He has won four Golden Globe Awards, seven British Academy Film Awards, and 23 Grammy Awards, and has received several gold and platinum records.

This article includes all the works performed by John Williams and the ensembles he conducted during his career, such as the London Symphony Orchestra and the Boston Pops Orchestra, as whose music director he served from 1980 to 1993. It also features a complementary section dedicated to his discography as a composer, which features many compositions which he himself did not record.

For a list of all his compositions, please refer to the List of compositions by John Williams.

Albums

Studio albums

Soundtrack albums / Motion Picture Scores composed and conducted by John Williams

Live albums

EPs

Studio recordings
{| class="wikitable"
|-
!  style="vertical-align:top; text-align:left; width:40px;"|Years
!  style="vertical-align:top; text-align:left; width:350px;"|Album
!  style="vertical-align:top; text-align:center; width:70px;"|Label
!  style="vertical-align:top; text-align:left; width:130px;"|Notes
|- style="vertical-align:top;" 
|  style="text-align:left; "|1988
|  style="text-align:left; "|1988 Summer Olympics Album - One Moment in Time"One moment in time" –"Olympic spirit" –"Shape of things to come" –"Indestructible" –"Reason to cry"
|  style="text-align:center; "|Arista Records ASCD-9745
|  style="text-align:center; "|Promo CD sampler; "Olympic Spirit": composed and conducted by John Williams.
|- style="vertical-align:top;" 
|  style="text-align:left; "|1996
|  style="text-align:left; "|John Williams Conducting The Boston Pops"Candide (Overture)" –"America the beautiful" –"This land is your land" –"When the Saints go marchin' in"
|  style="text-align:center; "|Polygram 64885-2
|  style="text-align:center; "|DiskArt
|- style="vertical-align:top;" 
|  style="text-align:left; "|2013
|  style="text-align:left; "|Oboe Concerto"I. Prelude"–"II. Pastorale"–"III. Commedia"
|  style="text-align:center; "|iTunes Release
|  style="text-align:center; "|Keisuke Wakao, Oboe; Boston Pops Orchestra; composed and conducted by John Williams.
|}

Soundtracks / Motion Picture Scores composed and conducted by John Williams
{| class="wikitable"
|-
!  style="vertical-align:top; text-align:left; width:40px;"|Years
!  style="vertical-align:top; text-align:left; width:350px;"|Album
!  style="vertical-align:top; text-align:center; width:70px;"|Label
!  style="vertical-align:top; text-align:left; width:130px;"|Notes
|- style="vertical-align:top;" 
|  style="text-align:left; "|1989
|  style="text-align:left; "|Born on the Fourth of July"A Hard Rain's A Gonna Fall (by Edie Brickell & New Bohemians)" –"The Early Days, Maassapequa, 1957" -"A Hard Rain's A Gonna Fall (by Edie Brickell & New Bohemians)"
|  style="text-align:center; "|MCA Records (UK) MCAT 1397
|  style="text-align:center; "|Promo; composed and conducted by John Williams: "The Early Days, Maassapequa 1957"; reissued in 1989 on a CD single
|- style="vertical-align:top;" 
|  style="text-align:left; "|2001
|  style="text-align:left; "|Harry Potter and the Sorcerer's Stone"Harry's Wondrous World" –"Platform Nine-And-Three-Quarters" –"And The Journey to Hogwarts" –"Hogwarts Forever! And The Moving Stairs" –"Hedwig's Theme"
|  style="text-align:center; "|Warner Music Poland 
|  style="text-align:center; "|Promo; composed and conducted by John Williams.
|- style="vertical-align:top;" 
|  style="text-align:left; "|2002
|  style="text-align:left; "|Star Wars: Episode II – Attack of the Clones"Across the Stars" (Love Theme from Attack of the Clones with Movie Dialog and Effects) –"Across the Stars" (Love Theme)/Across the Stars (Instrumental Edit)"
|  style="text-align:center; "|Sony Classical SSK 55977
|  style="text-align:center; "|Promo single; composed and conducted by John Williams.
|- style="vertical-align:top;" 
|  style="text-align:left; "|2005
|  style="text-align:left; "|Star Wars: Episode III – Revenge of the SithWal-Mart Limited Digital Download interview with composer John Williams
|  style="text-align:center; "|Sony Classical SK 94574
|  style="text-align:center; "|Composed and conducted by John Williams.
|}

Live recordings
{| class="wikitable"
|-
!  style="vertical-align:top; text-align:left; width:40px;"|Years
!  style="vertical-align:top; text-align:left; width:350px;"|Album
!  style="vertical-align:top; text-align:center; width:70px;"|Label
!  style="vertical-align:top; text-align:left; width:130px;"|Notes
|- style="vertical-align:top;" 
|  style="text-align:left; "|2006
|  style="text-align:left; "|Memoirs of a Geisha - Live Sessions"Sayuri's Theme" –"A Dream Discarded" –"Going to School" –Interview with John Williams & Yo-Yo Ma.
|  style="text-align:center; "|Sony Classical
|  style="text-align:center; "|iTunes release; Yo-Yo Ma, cello; John Williams, piano; composed and conducted by John Williams.
|}

EPs by Other Artists (Studio recordings)
{| class="wikitable"
|-
!  style="vertical-align:top; text-align:left; width:40px;"|Years
!  style="vertical-align:top; text-align:left; width:350px;"|Album
!  style="vertical-align:top; text-align:center; width:70px;"|Label
!  style="vertical-align:top; text-align:left; width:130px;"|Notes
|- style="vertical-align:top;" 
|  style="text-align:left; "|1959
|  style="text-align:left; "|Dreamsville"Two Sleepy People" –"Dreamsville" –"Soft Sounds" –"Slow And Easy"
|  style="text-align:center; "|Columbia B13271
|  style="text-align:center; "|Lola Albright feat. John Williams (Piano) on tracks Dreamsville, Soft Sounds & Slow And Easy
|- style="vertical-align:top;" 
|  style="text-align:left; "|1960
|  style="text-align:left; "|The Mancini Touch"Like Young" –"Robbin's Nest" –"A Cool Shade Of Blue" –"Let's Walk"
|  style="text-align:center; "|RCA Victor EPA-4351
|  style="text-align:center; "|Henry Mancini feat. Johnny Williams (Piano)
|- style="vertical-align:top;" 
|  style="text-align:left; "|1962
|  style="text-align:left; "|Songs for Christmas Vol. 1"Silent Night, Holy Night" –"O Little Town Of Bethlehem" –"O Come, All Ye Faithful (Adeste Fidelis)" –"Sweet Little Jesus Boy"
|  style="text-align:center; "|CBS (Netherlands) EP 5.513
|  style="text-align:center; "|Mahalia Jackson with orchestra and chorus directed by Johnny Williams.
|- style="vertical-align:top;" 
|  style="text-align:left; "|1962
|  style="text-align:left; "|Songs for Christmas Vol. 2"White Christmas" –"No Room in the Inn" –"Joy to the World" –"Go Tell It on the Mountain"
|  style="text-align:center; "|CBS (Netherlands) EP 5.514
|  style="text-align:center; "|Mahalia Jackson with orchestra and chorus directed by Johnny Williams.
|- style="vertical-align:top;" 
|  style="text-align:left; "|1962
|  style="text-align:left; "|Song of the Open Road"Song of the Open Road" –"The Girl in the Wood" –"The Wayfaring Stranger" –"North to Alaska"
|  style="text-align:center; "|CBS (UK) AGG 20036
|  style="text-align:center; "|Frankie Laine with orchestra and chorus directed by Johnny Williams.
|- style="vertical-align:top;" 
|  style="text-align:left; "|1963
|  style="text-align:left; "|Hell Bent for Leather!"High Noon (Do Not Forsake Me)" –"Bowie Knife" –"Mule Train" –"Cool Water"
|  style="text-align:center; "|CBS (Netherlands) EP 5.526
|  style="text-align:center; "|Frankie Laine with orchestra and chorus directed by Johnny Williams.
|- style="vertical-align:top;" 
|  style="text-align:left; "|1963
|  style="text-align:left; "|Great Songs of Love and Faith"The Green Leaves of Summer" –"Trees" –"Because" –"Danny Boy"
|  style="text-align:center; "|CBS (Netherlands) EP 5.522
|  style="text-align:center; "|Mahalia Jackson with orchestra and chorus directed by Johnny Williams.
|- style="vertical-align:top;" 
|  style="text-align:left; "|1963
|  style="text-align:left; "|Hell Bent for Leather!"High Noon" –"Gunfight at O.K. Corral" –"Bowie Knife" –"The 3.10 to Yuma"
|  style="text-align:center; "|CBS (Australia) BG-225001
|  style="text-align:center; "|Frankie Laine with orchestra and chorus directed by Johnny Williams.
|}

EPs by Other Artists (Soundtracks / Motion Picture Scores)
{| class="wikitable"
|-
!  style="vertical-align:top; text-align:left; width:40px;"|Years
!  style="vertical-align:top; text-align:left; width:350px;"|Film/TV & Tracks
!  style="vertical-align:top; text-align:center; width:70px;"|Label
!  style="vertical-align:top; text-align:left; width:130px;"|Notes
|- style="vertical-align:top;" 
|  style="text-align:left; "|1958
|  style="text-align:left; "|The Big Country"The Big Country" –"The Welcoming" –"The Old House" –"The Death Of Buck Hannery"
|  style="text-align:center; "|United Artists UEP 1014
|  style="text-align:center; "|Composed and conducted by Jerome Moross feat. John Williams (Piano)
|}

Singles
Studio recordings
{| class="wikitable"
|-
!  style="vertical-align:top; text-align:left; width:40px;"|Years
!  style="vertical-align:top; text-align:left; width:350px;"|Tracks
!  style="vertical-align:top; text-align:center; width:70px;"|Label
!  style="vertical-align:top; text-align:left; width:130px;"|Notes
|- style="vertical-align:top;" 
|  style="text-align:left; "|1962
|  style="text-align:left; "|Johnny Williams and His Orchestra"Montreal" –"Tuesday's Theme"
|  style="text-align:center; "|Columbia 4-42516 
|  style="text-align:center; "|Side A - composed by P. Knauer, arranged and conducted by Johnny WilliamsSide B - composed and conducted by Johnny Williams
|- style="vertical-align:top;" 
|  style="text-align:left; "|1963
|  style="text-align:left; "|Johnny Williams and His Orchestra"The Black Knight" –"Augie's Great Piano"
|  style="text-align:center; "|Columbia 4-42777 
|  style="text-align:center; "|Composed and conducted by Johnny Williams, piano.
|- style="vertical-align:top;" 
|  style="text-align:left; "|1963
|  style="text-align:left; "|Johnny Williams and His Orchestra (Something Cool For The Summer!)"The Black Knight" –"The Black Knight"
|  style="text-align:center; "|Columbia 4-42777 
|  style="text-align:center; "|Promo; composed and conducted by Johnny Williams.
|- style="vertical-align:top;" 
|  style="text-align:left; "|1996
|  style="text-align:left; "|Summon the Heroes "Summon the Heroes (Radio Edit)" –"Summon the Heroes (Album Version)"
|  style="text-align:center; "|Sony Classical SSK 6362 
|  style="text-align:center; "|Promo; composed and conducted by John Williams.
|- style="vertical-align:top;" 
|  style="text-align:left; "|1996
|  style="text-align:left; "|Summon the Heroes "Summon the Heroes (Radio Edit 1)" –"Summon the Heroes (Radio Edit 2)"
|  style="text-align:center; "|Sony Classical SAMPCD 01
|  style="text-align:center; "|Promo; composed and conducted by John Williams.
|- style="vertical-align:top;" 
|  style="text-align:left; "|2002
|  style="text-align:left; "|Call of the Champions'''"Call of the Champions (Radio Edit)" –"The Mission Theme"
|  style="text-align:center; "|Sony Classical SSK 55975 
|  style="text-align:center; "|Promo; composed and conducted by John Williams.
|}

Soundtracks / Motion Picture Scores composed and conducted by John Williams

Live recordings

Singles by Other Artists (Studio recordings)

Singles by Other Artists (Soundtracks / Motion Picture Scores)

Compilation albums

Expanded reissue soundtrack albums
This section features expanded reissue albums of already released scores.

Collaborations and Featurings
Studio albums (Collaborations & Featurings)

Soundtrack albums / Motion Picture Scores by Other Artists

Soundtrack albums / Motion Picture Scores by Various Artists

Live albums (Collaborations & Featurings)

Other album appearances

Audio stories
For reasons of relevance, this section deliberately excludes audiobooks. Over one hundred Star Wars audio books have been published since the 1990s, and most of them use the original music composed and performed by John Williams.

Various artist compilation albums

{| class="wikitable sortable"
|-
!style="width:3em"|Year
!style="width:18em"|Title(s)
!style="width:15em"|Album
!class="unsortable"|Notes
|-
| style="text-align:center;"|1961
| "Theme From 'Checkmate'"
| Twelve Big Hits!| Composed and conducted by Johnny Williams; Columbia.
|-
| style="text-align:center;"|1985
| "Main Title (Theme From Jaws)", "Flying (From E.T., The Extra-Terrestrial)", "The River (From The River)", "Over The Moon (From E.T., The Extra-Terrestrial)".
| Movie Greats| Some tracks composed and conducted by John Williams; MCA.
|-
| style="text-align:center;"|1986
| "Maria", "The Second Time Around", "The Pleasure Of Her Company"
| On The Street Where You Live: Vic Damone's Best| With Vic Damone; some tracks conducted by John Williams, CBS.
|-
| style="text-align:center;"|1990
| "Jerom Kern: Very warm for May", "Richard Rodgers: Spring is here", "George Gershwin: Love is here to stay", "Cole Porter: In the still of the night"
| The Jessye Norman Collection| With Jessye Norman; some tracks conducted by John Williams/Boston Pops, Philips.
|-
| style="text-align:center;"|1991
| "Born on the Fourth of July (remix)"
| Reel Music (Soundtrack Sampler From MCA)| Composed and conducted by John Williams; MCA, 2-CD promo compilation.
|-
| style="text-align:center;"|1992
| "Love is here to stay"
| Classics| With Jessye Norman; John Williams, piano, Philips.
|-
| style="text-align:center;"|1992
| "Somewhere In My Memory", "Merry Christmas, Merry Christmas", "Christmas Star"
| Home Alone 2 Lost In New York - Original Soundtrack Album| Some tracks composed and conducted by John Williams; "Somewhere In My Memory" performed by Bette Midler; Arista/BMG Special Products.
|-
| style="text-align:center;"|1993
| "Fanfare for the Common Man", "West Side Story: Selection", "A String of Pearls"
| Great Concert Halls of the World: Symphony Hall, Boston| Some tracks conducted by John Williams/Boston Pops, Philips.
|-
| style="text-align:center;"|1993
| "Somewhere In My Memory", "Merry Christmas, Merry Christmas", "Carol Of The Bells"
| Home Alone Christmas| Some tracks composed and conducted by John Williams; Arista/BMG Special Products.
|-
| style="text-align:center;"|1994
| "Candide: Make our garden grow"
| Greatest Hits - Bernstein| Conducted by John Williams/Boston Pops Orchestra, Sony.
|-
| style="text-align:center;"|1994
| "The Washington Post March", "Colonel Bogey March", "The Raider's March from Raiders of the Lost Ark", etc.
| Marches - Greatest Hits| Some tracks composed and conducted by John Williams/Boston Pops Orchestra, Sony.
|-
| style="text-align:center;"|1994
| "Strike up the band"
| Gershwin - Greatest Hits| Conducted by John Williams/Boston Pops Orchestra, Sony.
|-
| style="text-align:center;"|1994
|
| The Jazz Sound From Peter Gunn| With Henry Mancini; Johnny T. Williams, piano, Fresh Sound Records.
|-
| style="text-align:center;"|1995
| "Maid With The Flaxen Hair", "Suite bergamasque - Clair de lune"
| Debussy For Daydreaming| Conducted by John Williams/Boston Pops Orchestra, Philips.
|-
| style="text-align:center;"|1995
| "Simple Gifts"
| Ballet - Greatest Hits| Conducted by John Williams/Boston Pops Orchestra, Sony.
|-
| style="text-align:center;"|1996
| "Copland: Fanfare For The Common Man", "Gould: American Salute", "America, The Beautiful", etc.
| Boston Pops: America the Beautiful| Some tracks conducted by John Williams/Boston Pops Orchestra, Philips; reissued for digital download in 2014, Decca.
|-
| style="text-align:center;"|1996
| "Maid With The Flaxen Hair", "Suite bergamasque - Clair de lune"
| Quiet Music for Quiet Times| Conducted by John Williams/Boston Pops Orchestra, Philips.
|-
| style="text-align:center;"|1996
| "The Flying Theme (E.T.)", "We're Off To See The Wizard", "When You Wish Upon A Star", etc.
| Boston Pops: Wish Upon a Star| Some tracks composed and conducted by John Williams/Boston Pops Orchestra, Philips.
|-
| style="text-align:center;"|1996
| "Theme from Lost in Space, The Time Tunnel, The Land of Giants, etc."
| The Fantasy Worlds of Irwin Allen [Original Television Soundtracks]| 6-CD, some tracks composed and conducted by John Williams, GNP Crescendo.
|-
| style="text-align:center;"|1996
| "Theme from Lost in Space, The Time Tunnel, The Land of Giants, etc."
| The Fantasy Worlds of Irwin Allen: Special Bonus Disc| Some tracks composed and conducted by John Williams, GNP Crescendo.
|-
| style="text-align:center;"|1997
| "Superman - Love Theme", etc.
| Boston Pops: Romance Classics| Some tracks composed and conducted by John Williams/Boston Pops Orchestra, Philips.
|-
| style="text-align:center;"|1997
| "NBC News Theme (a.k.a The Mission)", etc.
| The Music of NBC News Volume II| Some tracks composed and conducted by John Williams; NBC News, Promo CD.
|-
| style="text-align:center;"|1998
| "Sleigh Ride", "We Wish You a Merry Christmas"
| I'll Be Home For Christmas| Some tracks conducted by John Williams/Boston Pops Orchestra; Sony.
|-
| style="text-align:center;"|1999
| "End Credits & End Titles (from Family Plot)"
| Alfred Hitchcock Presents... Signatures in Suspense| Composed and conducted by John Williams; Hip-O Records.
|-
| style="text-align:center;"|1999
| "2001: A Space Odyssey (Also Sprach Zarathustra-Intro)", "Star Wars (Main Title)", "Jaws: Main Title (Theme)", etc.
| Reel Blockbusters| Some tracks composed and conducted by John Williams; Hip-O Records.
|-
| style="text-align:center;"|1999
| "Adventures of Robin Hood: Robin Hood and His Merry Men", "Star Wars, Episode 4 - A New Hope: Main Theme", "Star Wars, Episode 5 - The Empire Strikes Back: The Imperial March"
| Music In Film| Some tracks composed and conducted by John Williams; Sony Classical.
|-
| style="text-align:center;"|1999
|  "Interlude (Night in Tunisia)", "Four" and "Early autumn"
| The Complete Anita O'Day Verve/Clef Sessions| With Anita O`Day Featuring John Williams (piano); Mosaic Records, MD9-188, Compilation
|-
| style="text-align:center;"|2000
|  "Long Ago (And Far Away)" and "I've Never Been In Love Before"
| The Complete Capitol Four Freshmen Fifties Sessions| With The Four Freshmen Featuring John Williams (harpsichord & celeste); Mosaic Records, MD9-203, Compilation
|-
| style="text-align:center;"|2000
| "Saving Private Ryan: Hymn To The Fallen"
| Critic's Choice: Leonard Maltin's Best Movie Themes of the '90s| Composed and conducted by John Williams; Atlantic.
|-
| style="text-align:center;"|2000
| "NBC News Theme (a.k.a The Mission)", etc.
| The Music of NBC News 2000| Some tracks composed and conducted by John Williams; NBC News, promo CD.
|-
| style="text-align:center;"|1999
| "Presumed Innocent: End Credits", "Stanley & Iris: End Credits", "The Cowboys: Main Title"
| Great Composers: John Williams| Some tracks conducted by John Williams; Varèse Sarabande.
|-
| style="text-align:center;"|2000
|
| Don't Make Waves/Penelope| Penelope's music composed and conducted by John Williams (1966); Chapter III.
|-
| style="text-align:center;"|2011
|
| Music from M Squad/The Music From Mickey Spillane's 'Mike Hammer
| With Stanley Wilson; M Squad: some tracks composed by John Williams (p); Collectables Records; reissued in 2014, Fresh Sound Records.
|-
| style="text-align:center;"|2001
| "American Collection Theme"
| Classic Yo-Yo| With Yo-Yo Ma; previously unreleased recording with the Recording Arts Orchestra of Los Angeles; Sony Classical.
|-
| style="text-align:center;"|2002
| "Schindler's List: Main Theme", "Now, Voyager: Main Theme", "Four Horsemen of the Apocalypse: Main Theme", etc.
| Classic Perlman: Rhapsody| With Itzhak Perlman; some tracks composed and conducted by John Williams; Sony Classical.
|-
| style="text-align:center;"|2002
| "  Saving Private Ryan - Hymn to the Fallen", "  Raiders of the Lost Ark - Raiders of the Lost Ark"
| Paramount Pictures' 90th Anniversary Memorable Scores| Some tracks composed and conducted by John Williams; Sony Classical.
|-
| style="text-align:center;"|2002
| "Battle Hymn Of The Republic", "Gould-American Salute"
| Mark Twain's America| Some tracks conducted by John Williams; Decca.
|-
| style="text-align:center;"|2002
| "Sabrina: End Credits"
| Great Movie Love Themes| Composed and conducted by John Williams; Varèse Sarabande.
|-
| style="text-align:center;"|2003
| "Stanley & Iris: End Credits"
| Varèse Sarabande: A 25th Anniversary Celebration| Composed and conducted by John Williams; Varèse Sarabande.
|-
| style="text-align:center;"|2003
| "Presumed Innocent: End Credits"
| Varese Sarabande: A 25th Anniversary Celebration, Vol. 2| Composed and conducted by John Williams; Varèse Sarabande.
|-
| style="text-align:center;"|2003
| "Across The Stars (from Star Wars Episode II)"
| Classics For A New Century| Composed and conducted by John Williams; Sony.
|-
| style="text-align:center;"|2003
| "La fille aux cheveux de lin"
| Debussy - Greatest Hits| Conducted by John Williams/Boston Pops Orchestra, Decca.
|-
| style="text-align:center;"|2003
| "America The Beautiful", "This Land Is Your Land", "Liberty Fanfare"
| Enduring Freedom - America's Greatest Hits| Some tracks composed and conducted by John Williams/Boston Pops Orchestra, Decca.
|-
| style="text-align:center;"|2004
| "Because", "Whither Thou Goest", "Trees", etc.
| Come on Children, Let's Sing/Great Songs of Love and Faith| With Mahalia Jackson; some tracks Conducted by John Williams, Sony.
|-
| style="text-align:center;"|2004
| "Strike up the Band"
| Gershwin: Strike Up the Band; Piano Concerto in F; Three Preludes; etc.| Conducted by John Williams/Boston Pops Orchestra, Universal Classics.
|-
| style="text-align:center;"|2004
| "This Land Is Your Land", "American Salute"
| America's Greatest Hits| Some tracks conducted by John Williams/Boston Pops Orchestra, Universal.
|-
| style="text-align:center;"|2004
| "Strike up the Band"
| Gershwin Without Words| Conducted by John Williams/Boston Pops Orchestra, Decca.
|-
| style="text-align:center;"|2004
| "Gershwin: Strike Up The Band", "Gershwin: Selections From 'Girl Crazy'"
| Gershwin - Greatest Hits| Some tracks conducted by John Williams/Boston Pops Orchestra, Decca.
|-
| style="text-align:center;"|2005
|
| Lost in Space 40th Anniversary Edition| Some tracks composed and conducted by John Williams; La-La Land Records.
|-
| style="text-align:center;"|2005
| "Falling in Love With Love", "In the Still of the Night", "Spring Is Here", etc.
| The Jessye Norman Collection - The Songbooks| With Jessye Norman; including the albums With a Song in My Heart & Lucky to Be Me; conducted and performed by John Williams/Boston Pops; Phillips.
|-
| style="text-align:center;"|2005
| "Old and Lost Rivers"
| Classical Cuisine - American Barbeque|  Conducted by John Williams/London Symphony Orchestra, Sony.
|-
| style="text-align:center;"|2005
| "Worry-go-round", "The boy next door", "Body and soul", "Out of nowhere", "Coquette"
| Don Fagerquist: Portrait Of A Great Jazz Artist| With Russell Garcia and His Orchestra; John Williams, piano; Fresh Sound Records.
|-
| style="text-align:center;"|2005
|
| Los Angeles River| With Russell Garcia and His Orchestra; piano on some tracks: John Williams; Fresh Sound Records.
|-
| style="text-align:center;"|2005
| 
| The James Dean Story (Sights and Sounds from a Legendary Life)| With Leith Stevens; Featuring John T. Williams (piano) on CD 1 (The James Dean Story (Original Music Soundtrack); Blue Moon, BMCD 4104, Compilation, Special 50th Anniversary Commemorative Collection
|-
| style="text-align:center;"|2006
| "Star Wars, Episode IV – A New Hope: Main Title", "E.T. The Extra-Terrestrial: Flying Theme", "Jaws: Theme", "Close Encounters of the Third Kind: The Dialogue"
| The Essential Hollywood| Some tracks by John Williams & The London Symphony Orchestra; Sony Classical.
|-
| style="text-align:center;"|2006
| "Fantasy for violin & orchestra on Porgy and Bess", "Preludes (3) for piano", "I Got Rhythm", etc.
| The Joshua Bell Collection| With Joshua Bell; including the 1998 album Gershwin Fantasy conducted and performed by John Williams/London Symphony Orchestra; Sony Classical.
|-
| style="text-align:center;"|2006
|
| Not With My Wife, You Don't!/Any Wednesday| Not With My Wife, You Don't!: music composed and conducted by John Williams; Film Score Monthly.
|-
| style="text-align:center;"|2006
|
| Diamond Head/Gone With the Wave| Diamond Head's music composed and conducted by John Williams; Film Score Monthly.
|-
| style="text-align:center;"|2006
|
| Bell, Book and Candle/1001 Arabian Nights| With George Duning; piano on Bell, Book and Candle: John Williams; Film Score Monthly.
|-
| style="text-align:center;"|2006
| "Home Alone: Holiday Flight", "Home Alone: The House"
| Fox Music: Top Shelf Library| 5-CD; Fox Music.
|-
| style="text-align:center;"|2006
| "With a song in my heart"
| Between Love And Loss| With Jessye Norman; conducted by John Williams/Boston Pops, Philips.
|-
| style="text-align:center;"|2007
| "Allegro ben ritmato e deciso from Three Preludes", "Nice Work If You Can Get It", "I Got Rhythm", "Love Is Here To Stay"
| The Essential Joshua Bell| With Joshua Bell; excerpts from the 1998 album Gershwin Fantasy conducted and performed by John Williams/London Symphony Orchestra, Sony Classical.
|-
| style="text-align:center;"|2007
| "We wish you a merry Christmas"
| The Ultimate Classical Christmas| Conducted by John Williams/Boston Pops Orchestra; Sony.
|-
| style="text-align:center;"|2007
| "Going to School"
| Appassionato| With Yo-Yo Ma; composed and accompanied on the piano by John Williams; Sony Classical.
|-
| style="text-align:center;"|2007
|
| Exploring New Sounds| With Pete Rugolo and His Orchestra; piano on some tracks: John T. Williams; Fresh Sound Records.
|-
| style="text-align:center;"|2008
| "Theme From Superman", "Prelude and Main Title", "The Planet Krypton", etc.
| Superman: The Music| 8-CD set, includes previously unreleased material; Superman: The Movie - music composed and conducted by John Williams; Superman II - music composed and conducted by Ken Thorne, from original material Composed by John Williams; Superman III - music composed and conducted by Ken Thorne, original Superman themes by John Williams; Superman IV: The Quest for Peace - music by John Williams, adapted and conducted by Alexander Courage; Film Score Monthly.
|-
| style="text-align:center;"|2009
| "Memoirs of a Geisha Suite"
| Yo-Yo Ma - 30 Years Outside the Box| With Yo-Yo Ma; previously unreleased performance recorded live in 2008, with the Chicago Symphony Orchestra conducted by John Williams; Sony.
|-
| style="text-align:center;"|2009
| "With a song in my heart"
| Honor! A celebration of the African American Cultural Legacy | With Jessye Norman; conducted by John Williams/Boston Pops, Decca.
|-
| style="text-align:center;"|2010
| "Theme From Superman"
| The Music Of DC Comics: 75th Anniversary Collection| Composed and conducted by John Williams, WaterTower Music
|-
| style="text-align:center;"|2011
| "The Poseidon Adventure: Main Title", "The Paper Chase: End Title", "Conrack: Main Title", "The Fury: For Gillian/End Title"
| 20th Century Fox: 75 Years of Great Film Music| Some tracks composed and conducted by John Williams; Colosseum/Varèse Sarabande.
|-
| style="text-align:center;"|2011
| "Jaws: Main Titles/First Victim Theme"
| Creepy Classics: Halloween's Greatest Hits|  Composed and conducted by John Williams, Deutsche Grammophon.
|-
| style="text-align:center;"|2011
| "Out of Africa: Love Theme", "Star Wars: Princess Leia's Theme"
| Classic Love At The Movies| Some tracks composed and conducted by John Williams/Boston Pops Orchestra, Decca.
|-
| style="text-align:center;"|2011
| "This Land Is Your Land", "Copland: Rodeo - Hoe-Down", "Gould: American Salute", "America, The Beautiful"
| Celebrate America - Songs for the 4th of July| Some tracks conducted by John Williams/Boston Pops Orchestra, Decca.
|-
| style="text-align:center;"|2011
|
| Remembers John Kirby/The Big Small Bands| With Dave Pell; piano and organ on The Big Small Bands: Johnny Williams; Fresh Sound Records.
|-
| style="text-align:center;"|2011
|
| Meet Mr. Roberts/Bottoms Up| With George Roberts And His Big Bass Trombone; Bottoms Up: conducted and arranged by John T. Williams (p); Fresh Sound Records.
|-
| style="text-align:center;"|2011
| "Seven Years in Tibet"
| Impressions| With Yo-Yo Ma; composed and conducted by John Williams; Sony Classical; reissued in 2012, Sony Classical, remastered
|-
| style="text-align:center;"|2014
| "Les parapluies de Cherbourg: I Will Wait for You", "Henry V: Orchestral Suite - no 4, Touch her soft lips and part", "Modern Times: Smile", etc.
| Concertos, Sonatas and more...| With Itzhak Perlman; some tracks composed and conducted by John Williams; Sony Classical.
|-
| style="text-align:center;"|2014
|
| André Previn in Hollywood/Soft and Swinging| With André Previn; André Previn in Hollywood: arrangements and musical direction by Johnny Williams; Vocalion.
|-
| style="text-align:center;"|2014
|
| Calypso/Belafonte Sings The Caribbean| With Harry Belafonte; piano on Calypso: John T. Williams (uncredited); Jackpot Records.
|-
| style="text-align:center;"|2014
| "Little David Play On Your Harp", "The Love Of God", "I Want To Be A Christian", etc.
| Complete Mahalia Jackson Vol.12 - 1961| With Mahalia Jackson; including the 1962 album Everytime I Feel The Spirit conducted by John Williams, Fremeaux & Associes.
|-
| style="text-align:center;"|2014
|
| Johnny Staccato/The Man With The Golden Arm| With Elmer Bernstein; Staccato: featuring John Williams (p); Fresh Sound Records.
|-
| style="text-align:center;"|2015
|
| Lost in Space 50th Anniversary Soundtrack Collection| 12-CD set, includes previously unreleased material; aome tracks composed and conducted by John Williams; other music by Hans J. Salter, Herman Stein, Richard LaSalle, Frank Comstock, Fred Steiner, Jeff Alexander, Warren Barker, Leith Stevens, Alexander Courage, Robert Drasnin, Cyril J. Mockridge, Gerald Fried, Pete Rugolo and Joseph Mullendore; La-La Land Records.
|-
| style="text-align:center;"|2015
| 
| Checkmate/Hong Kong| With Lionel Newman; "Checkmate" tracks composed and conducted by Johnny Williams; Fresh Sound Records.
|-
| style="text-align:center;"|2015
| 
| Rhythm in Motion/So Nice! with Johnny Desmond| With Johnny Desmond; music arranged and conducted by Johnny Williams; some tracks featuring Johnny Williams (p); three bonus tracks composed and performed by Johnny Williams: "Tuesday's Theme"; "The Black Knight"; "Augie's Great Piano"; Fresh Sound Records.
|-
| style="text-align:center;"|2016
| "The Flying Sequence / Can You Read My Mind (Feat. Margot Kidder)", "Lex Luthor's Lair"
| The Music Of DC Comics: Volume 2| Composed and conducted by John Williams, WaterTower Music
|-
| style="text-align:center;"|2017
| "Olympic Hymn"
| Bernstein: Chamber & Concert Music| Conducted by John Williams/Boston Pops Orchestra; Sony.
|-
| style="text-align:center;"|2017
| "Olympic Hymn"
| Leonard Bernstein: The Composer| Conducted by John Williams/Boston Pops Orchestra; Sony.
|-
| style="text-align:center;"|2017
| "Theme (from Sugarland Express)"
| The Real... Toots Thielemans| With Toots Thielemans; conducted by John Williams/Boston Pops Orchestra; Legacy Recordings.
|-
| style="text-align:center;"|2017
| 
| Peyton Place/Hemingway's Adventures of a Young Man| With Franz Waxman; Hemingway's Adventures of a Young Man: featuring Johnny Williams (p); La-La Land Records
|-
| style="text-align:center;"|2017
| "Treesong", "Concerto for Violin and Orchestra", "Three Pieces from Schindler's List for Solo Violin and Orchestra"
| Boston Symphony Orchestra: Complete Recordings on Deutsche Grammophon| "Treesong, Violin concerto": music composed and conducted by John Williams/BSO, Deutsche Grammophon
|-
| style="text-align:center;"|2017
| 
| Harry Potter: Original Motion Picture Soundtracks I-V| Harry Potter and the Sorcerer's Stone (2001), Harry Potter and the Chamber of Secrets (2002), Harry Potter and the Prisoner of Azkaban (2004): composed and conducted by John Williams; Harry Potter and the Goblet of Fire (2005): composed and conducted by Patrick Doyle; Harry Potter and the Order of the Phoenix (2007): composed by Nicholas Hooper; Rhino
|-
| style="text-align:center;"|2017
| "Fantasy For Violin And Orchestra On Porgy And Bess", "Three Preludes", "Songs For Violin And Orchestra", etc.
| Joshua Bell: The Classical Collection| "Gershwin Fantasy": music conducted by John Williams/London SO, Sony Classical
|-
| style="text-align:center;"|2017
| "Season One And Two Main Title Theme", "Season One And Two End Title Theme", "Season Three Main Title Theme", etc.
| Lost in Space: Title Themes from the Hit TV Series| Some tracks composed and conducted by John Williams, Spacelab9.
|-
| style="text-align:center;"|2022
| "Theme from Schindler's List", ""Flight to Neverland" from Hook"
| Hollywood Bowl 100: The First 100 Years Of Music| Live Recording. Some tracks composed and conducted by John Williams/Los Angeles Philharmonic Orchestra, Los Angeles Philharmonic Association. ("Theme from Schindler's List" recorded September 04, 2016 & "Flight to Neverland" recorded September 02, 2018)
|}

Video albums
 2002 E.T.: The Extra-Terrestrial (2-Disc Limited Collector's Edition). Special features: John Williams performs the "E.T." score live with the film at the Shrine Auditorium 2002 Premiere (Universal Studios Home Entertainment)
 2007 Broadway's Best at Pops. Arthur Fiedler, John Williams and Keith Lockhart/Boston Pops (PBS)
 2009 Clint Eastwood Presents - Johnny Mercer: The Dream's on Me. Jamie Cullum, Morgan Eastwood, Audra McDonald, John Williams, etc. (TCM)
 2013 Tanglewood 75th Anniversary Celebration. Keith Lockhart, John Williams, Stefan Asbury, Andris Nelsons, etc./Boston Pops, Tanglewood Music Center Orchestra, Boston Symphony Orchestra (C Major Entertainment)
 2015 A John Williams Celebration . Gustavo Dudamel/Los Angeles Philharmonic, John Williams as guest conductor and Itzhak Perlman on violin (C Major Entertainment)
 2019 Across The Stars (CD+DVD Deluxe Edition). DVD: Anne-Sophie Mutter In Conversation With John Williams; Mutter, Recording Arts Orchestra of Los Angeles/Williams (Deutsche Grammophon)
 2020 John Williams In Vienna. Mutter, Wiener Philharmoniker/Williams; Live recording (Deutsche Grammophon)

Discography as composer
John Williams himself recorded most of his compositions. However, there are some exceptions, and this section is therefore complementary to the main discography. In addition, it presents a special section dedicated to each of his concert works that have been recorded. As Williams' film works are loved by the public, they were much recorded and continue to be, so another section containing selections of some his works recorded by other artists is also featured.

Soundtracks conducted by others

Soundtracks using John Williams' themes

Concert works

Selective discography of his works recorded by others
 1962 Themes To Remember - Top TV Themes And Background Music. Stanley Wilson, Decca
 1962 Checkmate: Shelly Manne & His Men Play the Music of Johnny Williams from the TV Series. Arranged by John Williams (Reissued in 2002, Contemporary Records; Reissued in 2014 with Bonus Tracks, Jazz Musts)
 1962 The Theme From Ben Casey and the Top TV Themes From.... Valjean at the piano with orchestral accompaniment
 1965 André Previn Plays Music Of The Young Hollywood Composers. RCA Victor
 1972 Walter Matthau sings the love theme from 'Pete 'n' Tillie'. MCA Records 
 1973 Frank Sinatra – Ol' Blue Eyes Is Back. Reprise Records 
 1976 A Concert of Film Music. London Symphony Orchestra/Henry Mancini
 1977 Music Inspired By Star Wars And Other Galactic Funk. Meco, Millennium (Reissued in 1999, Hip-O Records)
 1978 Cinema Gala: Star Wars/Close Encounters of the Third Kind. Los Angeles Philharmonic Orchestra/Zubin Mehta
 1978 John Williams: Close Encounters of the Third Kind/Star Wars. National Philharmonic Orchestra/Charles Gerhardt
 1979 Digital Space. London Symphony Orchestra/Morton Gould (Reissued in 1985, Varèse Sarabande; Reissued in 2007 with previously unreleased material Morton Gould Conducts Film Score Classics And Rarities, Citadel Records)
 1980 John Williams: The Empire Strikes Back. National Philharmonic Orchestra/Charles Gerhardt
 1982 Flying (Theme from E.T.). London Symphony Orchestra/John Bell, Towerbell Records/UK SP
 1983 John Williams: Return of the Jedi. National Philharmonic Orchestra/Charles Gerhardt
 1983 John Williams: The Star Wars Trilogy. Utah Symphony Orchestra/Varujan Kojian (reissued for digital download in 2013, Varèse Sarabande)
 1984 Star Tracks. Cincinnati Pops Orchestra/Erich Kunzel
 1984 Time Warp. Cincinnati Pops Orchestra/Erich Kunzel
 1985 The Final Frontier - The Triple Album. London Symphony Orchestra/Roy Budd (Reissued in 1995 "Big Screen Adventures"; reissued for digital download in 2014 "Film Classics, Vol. 1", Collins Classics)
 1987 Hollywood’s Greatest Hits, Vol. I. Cincinnati Pops Orchestra/Erich Kunzel
 1987 Star Tracks II. Cincinnati Pops Orchestra/Erich Kunzel
 1989 Music From the Prince and the Pauper [and other film music]. National Philharmonic Orchestra/Charles Gerhardt
 1989 Classic Marches. Saint Louis Symphony Orchestra/Leonard Slatkin
 1990 Fantastic Journey. Cincinnati Pops Orchestra/Erich Kunzel
 1990 The Best Of John Williams, Philharmonic Rock Orchestra/Richard Hayman 
 1991 Movie Love Themes. Cincinnati Pops Orchestra/Erich Kunzel
 1994 The Great Fantasy Adventure Album. Cincinnati Pops Orchestra/Erich Kunzel
 1995 Journey To The Stars: A Sci Fi Fantasy Adventure. Hollywood Bowl Orchestra/John Mauceri
 1997 Beautiful Hollywood. Cincinnati Pops Orchestra/Erich Kunzel
 1998 Midway. Royal Scottish National Orchestra/Rick Kentworth (reissued for digital download in 2014, Varèse Sarabande)
 1998 Superman: The Movie. Royal Scottish National Orchestra/John Debney (reissued for digital download in 2014, Varèse Sarabande)
 1998 Hollywood Nightmares. Hollywood Bowl Orchestra/John Mauceri
 1998 Holiday Pops. Boston Pops Orchestra/Keith Lockhart
 1998 Gustav Holst: The Planets; John Williams: Star Wars Suite; Richard Strauss: Also sprach Zarathustra . Los Angeles Philharmonic Orchestra/Zubin Mehta, compilation (reissued partially in 2012, Decca)
 1999 Themes from The Phantom Menace and Other Film Hits. Royal Scottish National Orchestra/Frederic Talgorn
 1999 Amazing Stories. Royal Scottish National Orchestra/Joel McNeely, John Debney
 1999 The Great Movie Scores from the Films of Steven Spielberg. Cincinnati Pops Orchestra/Erich Kunzel
 2000 Jaws. Royal Scottish National Orchestra/Joel McNeely (reissued for digital download in 2014, Varèse Sarabande)
 2000 Dallas Christmas Gala. Dallas SO & Chorus/Andrew Litton, David R. Davidson
 2000 Devil's Dance. Gil Shaham & Jonathan Feldman
 2000 Great Orchestral Marches. Edmonton Symphony Orchestra/Uri Mayer
 2000 Hollywood Symphonic Concert - John Williams. Kanagawa Philharmonic Orchestra/Orie Suzuki
 2000 Mega Movies. Cincinnati Pops Orchestra/Erich Kunzel
 2001 Greatest Science Fiction Hits IV. Neil Norman And His Cosmic Orchestra
 2003 John Williams: 40 Years of Film Music. City of Prague Philharmonic (2-CD set, compilation)
 2003 Epics. Cincinnati Pops Orchestra/Erich Kunzel
 2005 Kreisler, Paganini, Sarasate, Wieniawski. Maxim Vengerov
 2005 Music from the Films of Steven Spielberg. City of Prague Philharmonic (2-CD set, compilation)
 2006 Great Film Fantasies. Cincinnati Pops Orchestra/Erich Kunzel
 2007 Movie Legends John Williams. Royal Philharmonic Orchestra
 2007 Symphonic Brass. The Black Dyke Mills Band/Nicholas J. Childs 
 2008 The Six Star Wars Films. City of Prague Philharmonic
 2009 Filmharmonic. Royal Philharmonic Orchestra (3-CD set)
 2009 A Family Christmas. Royal Scottish National Orchestra & Junior Chorus/Christopher Bell
 2009 The Hollywood Flute of Louise Di Tullio. Sinfonia Toronto/Ronald Royer
 2009 Alexandre Da Costa: Schindler's List. Bienne Symphonic Orchestra/Thomas Rösner 
 2010 Moviebrass - West Side Story Suite, Space Brass. Gomalan Brass Quintet
 2010 Schönbrunn 2010 - Moon, Planets, Stars. Vienna Philharmonic Orchestra/Franz Welser-Möst
 2011 Portals. St. Petersburg Symphony Orchestra/Vladimir Lande
 2012 The Complete Harry Potter Film Music Collection. City of Prague Philharmonic (2-CD set)
 2012 The Music of John Williams: The Definitive Collection. City of Prague Philharmonic (6-CD set, compilation)
 2012 Barber, Korngold: Violin Concertos. Alexander Gilman
 2012 John Williams Greatest Hits. Philharmonisches Orchester of Staatstheater Cottbus/Evan Christ
 2012 Silence on joue!/A Time for Us. Angèle Dubeau & La Pietà
 2013 La Creation Du Monde. Swedish Wind Ensemble/Christian Lindberg
 2013 300. Ingolf Wunder.
 2013 American Harp. Yolanda Kondonassis
 2013 The Silver Violin. Nicola Benedetti
 2013 Violin Showcase, Matthieu Arama
 2013 Nigunim: Hebrew Melodies. Gil Shaham, Orla Shaham.
 2013 My First Decade. Nicola Benedetti.
 2014 Eventide. Voces8.
 2014 Escape to Paradise. Daniel Hope, TodtenhaupAmmon, Sting/Royal Stockholm Philh. O, Quintet of the Kammerorchester Berlin/Shelley.
 2015 Music from The Star Wars Saga. City of Prague Philharmonic (Selections from the 2012 compilation The Definitive Collection)
 2015 Schindler's List: The Film Music of John Williams.  Elizabeth Hedman, Dan Redfeld
 2015 Hollywood Blockbusters, Vol. 2. Royal Philharmonic Orchestra/Nic Raine
 2015 Waldbühne 2015. Berliner Philharmoniker/Simon Rattle
 2015 Sixty-Eight Annual Midwest Clinic 2014. Carmel High School Symphony Orchestra/Soo Han, Margaret Hite, Elisabeth Ohly-Davis, Dr. Robert Gillespie, Michael Pote
 2015 On A Lighter Note. Frikki Walker.
 2015 Journey East. Nemanja Radulovic. 
 2016 Silence on joue: Take 2. Angèle Dubeau & La Pietà
 2017 Lights, Camera...Music! Six Decades of John Williams. Boston Pops Orchestra/Keith Lockhart
 2017 Sommernachtskonzert (Summer Night Concert) 2017. Vienna Philharmonic Orchestra/Christoph Eschenbach.
 2017 John Williams: Themes and Transcriptions for Piano. Co-arranged by John Williams and Simone Pedroni. Simone Pedroni, piano.
 2018 John Williams: A Life in Music. London Symphony Orchestra/Gavin Greenaway.
 2018 The Genius of Film Music - Hollywood 1980s-2000s. London Symphony Orchestra/Dirk Brossé.
 2019 Celebrating John Williams''. Los Angeles Philharmonic/Gustavo Dudamel (2 CD Set)

See also
 List of compositions by John Williams
 Star Wars music
 Superman music
 Harry Potter music

References

External links
 

Discographies of American artists
Jazz discographies
Film and television discographies